Gilukhipa, or more probable Kilu-Hepa in Hurrian language, in the Egyptian language Kirgipa (fl. early 14th c. BCE), was the daughter of Shuttarna II, king of Mitanni. She was the sister of Tushratta (later King of Mitanni), Biria-Waza and Artashumara.

Biography
For political reasons, Gilukhipa was sent to Egypt to join Amenhotep III in marriage. The Egyptian pharaoh made a special issue of commemorative scarabs on the occasion of his marriage to Gilukhipa in his 10th regnal year (ca.1378–1376 BCE), where he recorded that the princess was escorted by 317 ladies-in-waiting, women from the Mitanni king's royal palace. Gilukhipa became known as the "Secondary King's Wife," meaning she was secondary to Amenhotep III's chief wife, Queen Tiye.

Twenty-six years later, her niece Tadukhepa also became Amenhotep's wife.

References

14th-century BC Egyptian women
Hurrian people
Queens consort of the Eighteenth Dynasty of Egypt
Wives of Amenhotep III
Ancient Mesopotamian women